Just Dance Wii is a 2011 dance rhythm game developed by Ubisoft Paris and published by Nintendo. It was released for the Wii system on 13 October 2011 in Japan as the first Japanese installment in the Just Dance series published by Ubisoft.

Gameplay 

The game is based on Just Dance 2, as the user interface and features are largely identical to that said game, with every feature available except the online store. Karaoke-styled lyrics is a brand new mechanic to the Just Dance series, which would later carryover to the main series, starting with the PS3 version of Just Dance 3. Lyrics are highlighted with an icon shown next to the line with a color, based on its icon (light blue for male vocals and pink for female vocals). Players can also choose to play the full version or the short version.

Track list 
The game features 29 songs.

Reception 
According to Media Create, as of 11 March 2012, the game sold 560,301 copies in Japan.

Notes

References

2011 video games
Just Dance (video game series)
Dance video games
Fitness games
Japan-exclusive video games
Music video games
Ubisoft games
Video games developed in France
Wii games